Dr. Sanjay  Kute is a member of the 13th Maharashtra Legislative Assembly. He represents the Jalgaon (Jamod) Assembly Constituency. He belongs to the Bharatiya Janata Party Kute was a member of the 11th and 12th Assemblies too, and has been president of Buldhana district Bharatiya Janata Party. In July, 2007, Kute was arrested during an agitation for compensation to rain hit farmers.

Within BJP

General Secretary, Maharashtra State BJP (2014)
District President, Jalgaon Jamod, BJP (2003-2006)
President BJP Buldhana District (Since 2010)
Vice President of BJP maharshtra (2020)

References

Maharashtra MLAs 2014–2019
People from Buldhana district
Maharashtra MLAs 2004–2009
Maharashtra MLAs 2009–2014
Living people
Marathi politicians
Bharatiya Janata Party politicians from Maharashtra
1964 births
Maharashtra MLAs 2019–2024